Angelo Niculescu (1 October 1921 – 20 June 2015) was a Romanian football player and  manager. He is best remembered in Romania for being the national team's coach at the 1970 World Cup and for inventing the "temporizare" ("delaying") tactics in which the team keeps the possession of the ball inside its own half and the players are using many short passes from one side to another of the field in order to disrupt the opponents patience when they go out of their field to make pressing, this is also considered an early form of tiki-taka, with such tactics he managed to qualify Romania to a World Cup after more than 30 years and register a win against Czechoslovakia.

Playing career
Angelo Niculescu was born on 1 October 1921 in Craiova, Romania and he started playing football in 1937 at age 15 in Divizia B at local club Rovine Grivița. In 1939 he moved to play for neighboring team, FC Craiova with whom he won the 1942–43 championship which was not recognized by the Romanian Football Federation because the teams from Transylvania were unable to participate as the territory was annexed to Hungary due to the Second Vienna Award. During World War II his career was interrupted for a while as he was called by the Romanian Army to fight in the Eastern Front. In 1945, Niculescu went to play for Carmen București where he stayed two years, moving afterwards at Ciocanul București who after one year merged with Carmen in order to form Dinamo București where he played in the following two years, ending his career at age 29 in which he earned a total of 93 Divizia A appearances with 3 goals scored.

Managerial career

Angelo Niculescu started coaching in 1952 at Dinamo București's junior center, after one year moving to be the head coach of the senior squad which he helped win the first Divizia A title in the clubs history in 1955, also reaching the 1954 Cupa României final which was lost by Dinamo with 2–0 in front of Metalul Reșița and led the team in the first European match of a Romanian team in the 1956–57 European Cup in the 3–1 victory against Galatasaray, helping The Red Dogs go to the next phase of the competition where they were eliminated by CDNA Sofia. He left Dinamo in 1957 but after two short experiences at Steaua București and Tractorul Brașov, he returned at Dinamo in 1964, helping the club win another Divizia A title in the 1964–65 season, also he has a total of 16 matches led in European competitions, all with The Red Dogs consisting of 10 victories and 6 losses. He was named coach of Romania's national team in 1967, making his debut in a 1–0 home loss in front of Italy at the Euro 1968 qualifiers. He guided the national team threw the successful 1970 World Cup qualifiers where they earned the first position of a group composed of Greece, Switzerland and Portugal, thus qualifying for the final tournament after a absence of 32 years where they earned a 2–1 victory in front of Czechoslovakia but lost with 1–0 in front of World Cup title holders, England and with 3–2 in front of the eventual winners of the Mexican tournament, Brazil. He was very criticized because he did not use Nicolae Dobrin in any games at the 1970 World Cup, the reasons Niculescu didn't use him are unclear but the fact that Dobrin did not play is considered one of the most controversial moments in the history of the Romanian football. He also guided the national team at the 1972 Euro qualifiers where they earned the first position of a group composed of Czechoslovakia, Wales and Finland, thus managing to reach the quarter-finals where Romania was defeated by Hungary, who advanced to the final tournament. His last game led as Romania's manager took place on 29 October 1972 in a 2–0 home victory against Albania at the 1974 World Cup qualifiers, having a total of 38 games consisting of 12 victories, 17 draws and 9 losses. In 1973, Angelo Niculescu went to coach Sportul Studențesc București until 1977, then he went to coach for two years Politehnica Timișoara where in the 1977–78 season he was close to win the championship as the team was leading with 3 rounds before the end of the season but after a loss with 4–2 in front of Dinamo, they ended the championship on the 3rd position with 3 points behind champions, Steaua. From 1979 until 1980 he had a third spell at Dinamo București, then he coached SC Bacău for one season, moving to Universitatea Cluj for two seasons where in the first one, the team relegated to Divizia B and he ended his coaching career in 1984 after one season spent at Oțelul Galați, having a total of 445 Divizia A matches, consisting of 196 victories, 101 draws and 148 losses. After the 1989 Romanian Revolution, he went to work as technical director in Tunisia at Club Africain, bringing Ilie Balaci as head coach and in only one season spent at the club they won the CAF Champions League, Tunisian League and the Tunisian Cup. For representing his country at the 1970 World Cup, Niculescu was decorated by President of Romania Traian Băsescu on 25 March 2008 with the Ordinul "Meritul Sportiv" – (The Medal "The Sportive Merit") class III.

Innovative tactic
He is known in Romania for inventing the "temporizare" ("delaying") tactics in which the team keeps the possession of the ball inside its own half and the players are using many short passes from one side to another of the field in order to disrupt the opponents patience when they go out of their field to make pressing, this is also considered an early form of tiki-taka, with such tactics he managed to qualify Romania to a World Cup after more than 30 years and register a win against Czechoslovakia. In 2011 FIFA named Niculescu the inventor of the tiki-taka style of play and so did UEFA in 2014.

Writing
Angelo Niculescu started writing chronicles, comments and match analysis in 1958 as a journalist at the "Sportul popular" newspaper. He also wrote two volumes about football:
 Fotbal. Metode si mijloace de antrenament (Football. Training methods and means) - co-written with Ion V. Ionescu (1972)
 Corabia cu 11 pasageri (The ship with 11 passengers) (1974)

Personal life
He had four brothers and one of them, Jean Niculescu was a footballer at Olympia București. Angelo Niculescu died on 20 June 2015 in his apartament from Bucharest and the president of FIFA, Joseph Blatter said:"Please accept my condolences for the passing of former player and coach Angelo Niculescu. He will be remembered for his contribution to Romanian football, especially as the inventor of the tiki-taka style of play."

Honours

Manager
Dinamo București
Divizia A: 1955, 1964–65
Cupa României runner-up: 1954

Notes

References

External links

 
Angelo Niculescu player profile at Labtof.ro
Angelo Niculescu manager profile at Labtof.ro

1921 births
2015 deaths
Sportspeople from Craiova
Romanian footballers
Liga I players
Liga II players
FC Carmen București players
Maccabi București players
FC Dinamo București players
Romanian football managers
1970 FIFA World Cup managers
FC Dinamo București managers
FC Steaua București managers
Romania national football team managers
FC Sportul Studențesc București managers
FCM Bacău managers
FC Universitatea Cluj managers
ASC Oțelul Galați managers
Association football midfielders
Romanian people of World War II
Romanian military personnel of World War II
Romanian sportswriters
Romanian journalists
Romanian writers
Romanian male writers
20th-century Romanian writers
20th-century Romanian male writers